Red Flag AB was founded by Mr Green founder Mikael Pawlo, Mattias Söderhielm and Niklas Derouche. The first product from Red Flag is an "invoice without a company" solution. Red Flag raised 35,8 MSEK from Unibet founder Anders Ström and the Dinkelspiel family. The company is aiming for a billion SEK market.

The company is based in Stockholm and Malta. 

Red Flag merged with Bokio in April 2020.

References

Financial services companies of Sweden
Companies based in Stockholm